WVDM-LD, virtual channel 40 (UHF digital channel 22), is a low-powered Court TV-affiliated television station licensed to Quincy, Illinois, United States. The station is owned by the DTV America subsidiary of HC2 Holdings.

History 
The station’s construction permit was initially issued on October 2, 2012 under the calls of W40DM-D. It was changed the current WVDM-LD calls were assigned on February 8, 2017.

Digital channels
The station's digital signal is multiplexed:

References

External links
DTV America 

Low-power television stations in the United States
Innovate Corp.
VDM-LD
Television channels and stations established in 2012
2012 establishments in Illinois